Pre-B-cell leukemia transcription factor 3 is a protein that in humans is encoded by the PBX3 gene.

References

Further reading

External links 
 
 

Transcription factors